Willie V. Miller Jr. (born July 13, 1977) is a Filipino former professional basketball player. He last played for the Pilipinas MX3 Kings of the ASEAN Basketball League. He has started at the point guard position mostly but could also play the shooting guard spot. Miller has won four PBA championships and two PBA Most Valuable Player Awards. 

Miller played college basketball for Letran, where he was highly promoted in the national media as a future PBA superstar. After graduating, he was selected with the first overall pick in the 2001 PBA draft by the Thunder. Miller led them to two PBA championships before he got traded to the Alaska Aces where he also won one. He also won one championship with Talk N' Text.

Collegiate career
Miller played collegiate basketball for the Letran Knights in the NCAA.

Professional career

Metropolitan Basketball Association
In 1999, Miller turned pro and instead opted to play for the expansion Nueva Ecija Patriots of the MBA. With Miller parading the Patriots, he was ranked second in the league in scoring averaging 23.6 a contest and made it to the MBA First Five. However, the Patriots won only five games in his first season.

Despite another impressive second year with Nueva Ecija, they never made it to the playoffs as the team ranked among the worst teams in the league during the 2000 season.

Philippine Basketball Association

Red Bull (2001–2003)
In 2001, Miller opted out of the MBA to join the PBA Rookie Draft. Batang Red Bull Thunder, with the top overall pick in the draft, selected Miller as the first pick, despite speculations of possibly choosing Filipino-American John Arigo.

In his first season, Miller was playing the backup role to Jimwell Torion at point guard but was able to contribute solid numbers in his PBA debut. He played a key role in Red Bull's 2001 Commissioners Cup championship upset of the San Miguel Beermen. In Game 5, he made a last-second block on Beermen import Nate Johnson to preserve the Thunder's victory, and a 3-2 series lead.

2002: MVP year
Fortunes change 2002, despite playing sparingly with Torion, Junthy Valenzuela and Lordy Tugade, Miller played a huge role for Red Bull. After an impressive performance against the RP-Hapee Training Pool in which he single-handedly led Red Bull to an overtime win over the Nationals, Miller performances alongside the impressive play of teammate Davonn Harp led to Red Bull's second PBA title in the 2002 Commissioners Cup.

He continued his play all the way to the All-Filipino Cup almost leading the Thunder to another finals berth. At season's end, he was selected to the PBA Mythical Team and won the PBA Most Valuable Player Award, the only player in league history to win the award with a scoring average below 10 points a contest. Miller beat teammate Harp for the award.

Miller continued to play his usual performances in the 2003, making it to the Mythical Team for the second straight season.

Talk 'N Text (2004–2006)
In the 2004 offseason, Miller was traded by Red Bull to the Talk 'N Text Phone Pals in a one-sided deal. The transaction paved way for a strong backcourt duo between him and 2003 Rookie of the Year Jimmy Alapag while playing alongside 2003 MVP Asi Taulava and veterans Vic Pablo, Mark Telan, and rookie Harvey Carey.

During the 2004-05 PBA season, the Phone Pals played in two of the three finals appearances, with Miller playing big roles for the Phone Pals. However, losses to Barangay Ginebra and San Miguel denied Talk 'N Text a championship.

However, Miller played big games for the Phone Pals. He was instrumental in Talk 'N Text's come-from-behind win over Ginebra in Game 4 of the 2004-05 PBA Philippine Cup finals and in a losing effort scoring 32 points in Game 6.

He was named the 2005 PBA Fiesta Conference Best Player after another strong performance leading Talk 'N Text to the best record during the tournament.

At season's end, he was named to the Mythical Team joining Alapag on the spot.

Alaska Aces (2006–2010)

Willie once again played an all-around performance in the 2005-06 season. However, his stellar play could not lead the Phone Pals back to the finals of the Fiesta Conference. At the middle of the 2006 Philippine Cup, Miller was traded to the Alaska Aces as part of a big trade with the Phone Pals.

This time, Miller's backcourt partner would be Mike Cortez and with them, Jeffrey Cariaso, Sonny Thoss, and Reynel Hugnatan, the Aces took third-place honors during the conference after falling a game short against Purefoods for a finals berth.

In the 2006-07 Philippine Cup, Miller led Alaska in numerous categories for the injury-riddled Aces.

In the 2007 Fiesta Conference, he led the Alaska Aces with the help of 2007 PBA Fiesta Conference Best Import Rossell Ellis to the championships once again after 5 years. Winning the championship against Talk 'N Text in seven games despite being down 3-2 in the series making it the club's 12th title. He also bagged the PBA Most Valuable Player once again in that season, as well as the PBA Finals MVP.

In the 08-09 PBA Philippine Cup All-Filipino Conference, Miller won his second best player of the conference award, leading his team to the best record in the eliminations and eventually to the championship round. There, Miller performed superbly, averaging 15.7 points, 4.6 rebounds, and 6.5 assists and making some clutch plays. In Game 2, with Alaska down 84-89 with less than 7 minutes to play, he sparked a fiery rally, scoring six points in a decisive 16-0 run that eventually won them the game. Miller also played the hero in Game 5, where he scored 15 points, including an emphatic (and somewhat ill-advised) game-clinching three-pointer with 8.7 seconds remaining. However, the Aces lost to the Talk 'N Text Tropang Texters in game seven, with Miller missing two free throws in the final 16 seconds that could have tied the game.

Barangay Ginebra Kings (2010–2011)

2010 Fiesta Conference
In the middle of the Fiesta Conference, Alaska traded him to Ginebra in exchange for Cyrus Baguio who wanted to have more minutes. On his debut with the Kings, they lost to his former team. Ultimately, they ended their season in the quarterfinals to the Aces.

2010-2011 Philippine Cup
Ginebra amassed an impressive 10-4 card but it was only enough for 3rd place if only Miller did not turned the ball at least once in 3 out of there 4 games they could have avoided Alaska and gain Twice-to-beat Advantage. They will win against Alaska though 2-1 with a come from 0-1 deficit while trailing 20 points in the first quarter in game 3. But Miller was just limited to 2 points in game 1 and 1 point in game 3.

2011 Commissioner's and Governors Cup
As the season went through, Miller's minutes winded down due to the rising of then rookies John Wilson and Robert Labagala as well as the return of Mark Caguioa's superstar game. Before the start of the playoffs of the third conference, he got traded to the then Air21 Express who were looking for a guard that could help Dondon Hontiveros.

Barako Bull Energy (2011–2012)
Miller joined the Air21 Express before the start of the 2011-2012 season. The Express renamed its team to Barako Bull Energy after the sale of the majority share of the Energy Food and Drinks, a subsidiary of Photokina Marketing that exclusively distributed Red Bull Energy Drink to the Philippines to the Lina Group of Companies.

GlobalPort Batang Pier (2012–2013)
Miller was involved in the biggest trade during the off-season before the 2012–13 season which sent him first to Barangay Ginebra before landing to GlobalPort.

Barako Bull Energy (2013–2014)
He was back in Barako Bull's arms again after he was traded in the offseason for oft-injured center Enrico Villanueva.  His role in the team is more of a mentor to young guards and a voice in the locker room, though he can score and make plays for his teammates whenever he needs to.  He was let go by the team after his contract expired last season and is contemplating retirement.

Return to Talk 'N Text (2015)
He has agreed to terms with the Talk 'N Text Tropang Texters, a franchise he played several seasons for in the past. He won eventually one Commissioner's Cup title with the Texters.

ASEAN Basketball League

Pilipinas MX3 Kings (2015–2016)
He has agreed to terms with the Pacquiao Powervit Pilipinas Aguilas (which was later renamed to Pilipinas MX3 Kings) before the season start, a team which play in the ASEAN Basketball League. He scored 12 points in his ABL debut.

International career
Miller was chosen by head coach Chot Reyes to play for the RP Training Pool in 2005. He played well for the Philippines in the FIBA-Asia tournament and participated in the William Jones Cup in Taiwan, when the country finished third. However, Miller played only three games after suffering an injury and was replaced by Denok Miranda.

In 2006, Miller played for the team in a Qatar Invitational tournament along with the two-game exhibition against the Lebanon national basketball team.

In 2008, he was again included in the RP Training Pool under former coach, Yeng Guiao.

He was among the 12 players for Team Pilipinas that played in the 2009 FIBA Asia Championship.

PBA career statistics

Correct as of September 25, 2015

Season-by-season averages

|-
| align=left | 
| align=left | Red Bull
| 51 || 20.5 || .416 || .279 || .759 || 2.8 || 2.3 || .8 || .1 || 7.7
|-
| align=left | 
| align=left | Red Bull
| 47 || 25.9 || .414 || .306 || .705 || 3.6 || 3.6 || 1.0 || .2 || 9.7
|-
| align=left | 
| align=left | Red Bull
| 43 || 30.0 || .444 || .329 || .792 || 4.5 || 3.1 || 1.4 || .2 || 14.2
|-
| align=left | 
| align=left | Talk 'N Text
| 80 || 35.4 || .384 || .324 || .763 || 5.9 || 4.7 || 1.3 || .2 || 16.1
|-
| align=left | 
| align=left | Talk 'N Text
| 20 || 33.1 || .351 || .311 || .697 || 5.3 || 3.9 || .9 || .0 || 12.2
|-
| align=left | 
| align=left | Alaska
| 28 || 29.6 || .388 || .365 || .679 || 4.1 || 3.0 || .8 || .1 || 12.5
|-
| align=left | 
| align=left | Alaska
| 53 || 37.7 || .447 || .353 || .661 || 4.7 || 5.2 || .8 || .1 || 19.1
|-
| align=left | 
| align=left | Alaska
| 46 || 36.2 || .452 || .353 || .719 || 5.2 || 4.5 || 1.1 || .1 || 20.7
|-
| align=left | 
| align=left | Alaska
| 47 || 36.0 || .399 || .335 || .663 || 5.4 || 4.8 || .7 || .1 || 16.5
|-
| align=left | 
| align=left | Alaska/Ginebra
| 49 || 30.6 || .407 || .349 || .712 || 5.0 || 4.0 || .7 || .1 || 13.6
|-
| align=left | 
| align=left | Ginebra
| 49 || 26.9 || .403 || .354 || .707 || 4.0 || 2.8 || .6 || .0 || 10.9
|-
| align=left | 
| align=left | Barako Bull
| 42 || 35.2 || .434 || .309 || .752 || 4.5 || 4.3 || 1.0 || .1 || 14.9
|-
| align=left | 
| align=left | GlobalPort
| 38 || 27.1 || .378 || .319 || .693 || 4.3 || 3.5 || .4 || .1 || 11.2
|-
| align=left | 
| align=left | Barako Bull
| 33 || 23.9 || .393 || .273 || .600 || 3.8 || 3.0 || .3 || .0 || 9.2
|-
| align=left | 
| align=left | Talk 'N Text
| 17 || 14.5 || .366 || .309 || .800 || 1.7 || 1.8 || .3 || .0 || 4.8
|-
| align=left | Career
| align=left |
| 643 || 30.5 || .411 || .331 || .716 || 4.5 || 3.8 || .9 || .1 || 13.5

References

External links
 Alaska Aces Willie Miller profile
 Archived Geocities information

1977 births
Living people
Alaska Aces (PBA) players
ASEAN Basketball League players
Barako Bull Energy players
Barako Bull Energy Boosters players
Barangay Ginebra San Miguel players
Basketball players from Zambales
Filipino people of African-American descent
NorthPort Batang Pier players
Letran Knights basketball players
Philippine Basketball Association All-Stars
Philippines men's national basketball team players
Filipino men's basketball players
Point guards
Shooting guards
Sportspeople from Olongapo
TNT Tropang Giga players
Barako Bull Energy Boosters draft picks